Big Sand is a small remote crofting village in Highland, Scotland. As the name suggests it is situated beside a large, unspoiled beach. Longa Island, a small uninhabited island, is easily visible.

Transportation 
The B8021 road links Big Sand to Gairloch and also North Erradale and Malvaig.

Tourism 
Nearby is a popular campsite for tourists.

References

Populated places in Ross and Cromarty